Independent Music Awards may refer to:
Independent Music Awards (IMAs)
 AIM Independent Music Awards
 Canadian Independent Music Awards
 AIR Independent Music Awards
 PLUG Independent Music Awards